Nocturnal clitoral tumescence (NCT), colloquially known as morning bean, is a spontaneous swelling of the clitoris during sleep or when waking up. Similar to the process in males, nocturnal penile tumescence, females experience clitoris tumescence or engorgement of the vagina mainly during REM sleep phase.

According to Fisher et al., the increase in vaginal blood flow associated with NCT during REM sleep is similar to the process in men in frequency, i.e. 95% of REM phases. It does occur a bit more often in non-REM sleep, and each episode appears shorter in duration. In terms of magnitude, NCT is similar to that induced by erotic stimulation when awake. The phenomenon was first documented in 1970 by Karacan et al., with a single aforementioned follow-up study in 1983 by Fisher et al.

See also
 Rapid eye movement sleep

References

Sleep
Clitoris
Sexual arousal